Henry McKinstry (born 1805, Antrim, Ireland - died April 17, 1871) was mayor of Hamilton, Ontario from 1859 to 1861. He presided over the arrangements for the visit of Edward, Prince of Wales to the city in 1860, the first royal visit in Hamilton's history.

References

Mayors of Hamilton, Ontario
1805 births
1871 deaths
People from Antrim, County Antrim